Roger Antoine (28 June 1929 – 11 August 2003) was a French basketball player. He competed in the men's tournament at the 1956 Summer Olympics and the 1960 Summer Olympics.

References

External links
 

1929 births
2003 deaths
French men's basketball players
Olympic basketball players of France
Basketball players at the 1956 Summer Olympics
Basketball players at the 1960 Summer Olympics
Sportspeople from Bamako
1954 FIBA World Championship players